Dmytro Mykhaylovych Nepohodov (born 17 February 1988) is a professional footballer who plays as a goalkeeper for Chornomorets Odesa. Born in Ukraine, he represented the Kazakhstan national team.

Career

Club
Nepohodov's first professional club was Olympique de Marseille in France Ligue 1, but he didn't make his debut in this team. Next he signed a contract with FC Metalurh Donetsk in Ukrainian Premier League and made his debut against FC Chornomorets Odesa on 18 April 2010.

On 17 January 2018, Tobol announced that Nepohodov had signed a new one-year contract with the club.

On 14 January 2019, Nepohodov signed for FC Ordabasy on loan from FC Astana, returning to Astana in January 2020. On 5 January 2022, Astana announced that Nepohodov had left the club after his contract had expired.

On 27 January 2022, Nepohodov signed a one-year contract with Tobol. On 15 June 2022, Tobol announced that Nepohodov had left the club by mutual agreement.

International
On 2 October 2018, Nepohodov was called up to the Kazakhstan national team for their UEFA Nations League matches against Latvia and Andorra on 11 October and 16 October 2018. He made his debut for the squad on 19 November 2018 in a Nations League game against Georgia.

Career statistics

Club

International

Statistics accurate as of match played 19 November 2019

References

External links
Player's Info on Metalurh Official Website 
 
Profile at Olympique Official Website 

1988 births
Living people
Ukrainian footballers
Ukraine youth international footballers
Ukraine under-21 international footballers
Ukrainian expatriate footballers
Kazakhstani footballers
Kazakhstan international footballers
Ukrainian emigrants to Kazakhstan
People with acquired Kazakhstani citizenship
Ukrainian people of Kazakhstani descent
Kazakhstani people of Ukrainian descent
Olympique de Marseille players
FC Metalurh Donetsk players
FC Urartu players
FC Vorskla Poltava players
FC Tobol players
FC Astana players
FC Ordabasy players
FC Chornomorets Odesa players
Ukrainian Premier League players
Expatriate footballers in France
Expatriate footballers in Armenia
Expatriate footballers in Kazakhstan
Association football goalkeepers
Armenian Premier League players
Kazakhstan Premier League players
Ukrainian expatriate sportspeople in France
Ukrainian expatriate sportspeople in Armenia
Ukrainian expatriate sportspeople in Kazakhstan
Footballers from Kyiv